LY-293284 is a research chemical developed by the pharmaceutical company Eli Lilly and used for scientific studies. It acts as a potent and selective 5-HT1A receptor full agonist. It was derived through structural simplification of the ergoline based psychedelic LSD, but is far more selective for 5-HT1A with over 1000x selectivity over other serotonin receptor subtypes and other targets. It has anxiogenic effects in animal studies.

See also
 8-OH-DPAT
 RDS-127
 RU-28306

References 

Serotonin receptor agonists
Anxiogenics
Eli Lilly and Company brands
Tryptamines
Ketones